World Serpent Distribution was a British record label and music distribution house formed in the 1990s by David Gibson, Alan Trench and Alison Webster. Douglas Pearce of Death In June coined the company name in 1991, World Serpent being another name for Jörmungandr.

Founding
World Serpent was well known for distributing music by many post-industrial, apocalyptic folk, neofolk, avant-garde and otherwise esoteric or experimental artists, such as Death In June through NER, Current 93 through Durtro, Sol Invictus through Tursa, Coil through Threshold House, Nurse With Wound through United Dairies, Zone through Potentia, Elijah's Mantle through De Nova Da Capo, Orchis through Cryptanthus, Ozymandias through Ramses Records and many others. Many of these artists also ended up collaborating with or being influenced by one another, causing the World Serpent name to become synonymous with many of the artists and labels distributed through the company during the early 1990s.

Bankruptcy
Following a long period of rumours, Boyd Rice left World Serpent Distribution. He was followed shortly thereafter by Douglas Pearce, Richard Leviathan and Albin Martinek. Subsequently, fewer and fewer releases began to be distributed by World Serpent, leading to much fan speculation. In October 2002, a claim filed by Pearce in 2000 was successfully settled out of court, resulting in Pearce receiving unpaid royalties from the Court Funds Office. Pearce also gave back his shares in the company he had helped form, but was no longer interested in or affiliated to.  Founder Alan Trench left World Serpent Distribution at the end of 2003. It was confirmed in August 2004 that World Serpent Distribution was no longer operating and had gone bankrupt. Many artists distributed through World Serpent, such as Chris and Cosey, had not been informed by the company and may still be owed past dues.

See also
 List of record labels

References

British record labels
Record labels disestablished in 2004
Industrial record labels
Experimental music record labels